The 2015–16 season was the 117th in Athletic Clubs history and the 85th in the top tier. On 17 August 2015, Athletic defeated Barcelona 5–1 on aggregate to win the Supercopa de España, the club's first silverware since 1984.

Squad
According to the official website. Sabin Merino wore number 25 in domestic matches.

Player statistics

Disciplinary record

From the youth system

Transfer
In

Out

Staff
According to the official website.

Pre-season and friendlies
For the second time in their history (117 years), Athletic played in the United States when they shut out Club Tijuana 2–0 in a preseason contest in Boise, Idaho on 18 July 2015. The team's first trip to the U.S. took place on 4 April 1967 in Chicago, when Athletic beat Red Star Belgrade 3–1, also in a friendly.

Competitions

Overview

Supercopa de España

La Liga

League table

Results summary

Round by round

Matches

Copa del Rey

Round of 32

Round of 16

Quarter-finals

UEFA Europa League

Qualifying phase

Third qualifying round

Play-off round

Group stage

Knockout phase

Round of 32

Round of 16

Quarter-finals

References

Athletic Bilbao seasons
Athletic Bilbao
Athletic Bilbao